Francisco Javier Fernández is the minister for tourism and sport in Andalusia, Spain.

References 

Living people
Members of the Parliament of Andalusia
1969 births
People from Utrera